The TVR 400/450SE was a series of open sports cars designed and built by TVR in the late eighties and early nineties. The 400SE was introduced in 1988, the 450SE a year later. The 400SE was the last of the Wedges built, with the last cars being produced in late 1991 and registered in 1992. There were also special versions built, with two Sprintex supercharged 400SX built by dealer 'Northern TVR Centre' in 1989, and three Griffith engined 430SEs were constructed in 1991.

History
The 400SE was largely similar to late 390SEs, but featured marginally larger displacement - 3,948 versus 3,905 cc. The body was as for Series 2 390SEs, with the more rounded nose and a large rear underbody aerofoil. An asymmetrically vented bonnet hinted at what was underneath, and there was a large rear spoiler (smaller than the 'bathtray' style used on the SEAC, but still large). The appearance was considerably more mature than the wild SEAC, but both suffered from the large transmission tunnel which cramped the footwell and serious heatsink from the large engines. On the plus side was the "phenomenal noise" and "exhilarating acceleration".

Ventilated front disc brakes and fifteen inch wheels were standard fitment, with power steering available and later made standard. In 1989 the even bigger engined 450SE appeared, with an extra 45 bhp but otherwise hard to distinguish from the 400. Production of the 450SE ended in 1990 after 35 had been built.

There was also the 1989 400SX, a supercharged version developed by "Northern TVR Centre" in Barrow-in-Furness. Along with DPR Forced Induction Systems Sprintex supercharger units were fitted, and while power and torque outputs are unknown the smaller engined 350SX showed increases of over thirty percent, which would mean ample power for most. The supercharged versions provided superb mid-range punch, compared to the peakier naturally aspirated models.

The last development of the SE was the 430SE, three of which were built in 1991. They used the 4.3 litre V8 engine also seen in the recently introduced TVR Griffith; one of them was shown at the 1991 Birmingham Motor Show.

Specifications

References

400 SE
Sports cars
Rear-wheel-drive vehicles
Cars introduced in 1988
Cars discontinued in 1991